The Double is a term in Gaelic games that refers to a county winning the All-Ireland Senior Football Championship and the All-Ireland Senior Hurling Championship in the same year.  Other major trophies won in combination in the same year at minor or under-21 levels are also often referred to as doubles.  Similarly, the winning of the All-Ireland and the National League titles in the same year may also be referred to as the Double, albeit an inferior one.

The Double

Historically it has been unusual for counties to be strong in both codes simultaneously. Indeed, historically many counties have tended to favour one code over the other long term. Dublin and Kerry, for example, have historically dominated football, but been weaker in hurling, while Kilkenny and Limerick are powerful in hurling, but much weaker in football. Only two counties have achieved this rare distinction at Senior level, both on two separate occasions; only Cork have done so in recent times, although Galway and Offaly have both come within a single win on one occasion:

National League-All-Ireland double

An All-Ireland, national league double involves winning both trophies in either sports code, rather than winning trophies in different codes. As might be expected, this is a much more common double.

Key

Near Doubles

A great many sides over the years have come close to winning the coveted senior double but narrowly failed to do so by losing one or both of the championships at the end of the season.

The full list of these teams:

Wexford in 1890, hurling championship runners-up/football championship runners-up
Dublin in 1892, hurling championship runners-up/football championship winners
Cork in 1893, hurling championship winners/football championship runners-up
Cork in 1894, hurling championship winners/football championship runners-up
Dublin in 1894, hurling championship runners-up/football championship winners
Dublin in 1896, hurling championship runners-up/football championship runners-up
London in 1901, hurling championship winners/football championship runners-up
London in 1902, hurling championship runners-up/football championship runners-up
London in 1903, hurling championship runners-up/football championship runners-up
Dublin in 1906, hurling championship runners-up/football championship winners
Cork in 1907, hurling championship runners-up/football championship runners-up
Dublin in 1908, hurling championship runners-up/football championship winners
Wexford in 1918, hurling championship runners-up/football championship winners
Dublin in 1920, hurling championship winners/football championship runners-up
Dublin in 1921, hurling championship runners-up/football championship winners 
Dublin in 1924, hurling championship winners/football championship runners-up
Galway in 1925, hurling championship runners-up/football championship winners
Dublin in 1934, hurling championship runners-up/football championship runners-up
Dublin in 1942, hurling championship runners-up/football championship winners
Cork in 1956, hurling championship runners-up/football championship runners-up
Offaly in 1981, hurling championship winners/football championship runners-up
Cork in 1999, hurling championship winners/football championship runners-up
Galway in 2001, hurling championship runners-up/football championship winners

See also
 Dual county
 Double (association football)

References

Gaelic games terminology